Shaw Boulevard station (also called Shaw for short) is an elevated Manila Metro Rail Transit (MRT) station situated on Line 3. The station is located in the Mandaluyong portion of Ortigas Center and is named after Shaw Boulevard, since the station lies directly above the boulevard. Being at the center of the whole line, many commuters regard Shaw Boulevard station as the "central terminal" of the line.

The station is the seventh station for trains headed to Taft Avenue and North Avenue. It is one of five stations on the line where passengers can catch a train going in the opposite direction without paying a new fare due to the station's layout. The other four stations are Araneta Center-Cubao, Boni, Buendia, Ayala, and Taft Avenue. Excluding Araneta Center-Cubao station, it is also one of four stations on the line with its concourse level located above the platform.

Station layout
Shaw Boulevard station is the only station on the line with 3 tracks; with 1 reserve track used for temporary parking of disabled trains and as a termination track when regular train service is disrupted, and 2 for regular train service. It is the only elevated station in the line to feature a concourse on top of the platforms at the 3rd level, the only station in the line with a gable pitched roof, and the only station in the line to have two concourses, which are split into unconnected sections.

Shangri-La concourse 
The northern Shangri-La concourse (also referred to as Building A) provides direct access to Shangri-La Plaza and indirect access to the Edsa Shangri-La Hotel and SM Megamall. It also provides direct access to Starmall EDSA and its jeepney and UV Express terminals. Exiting through this concourse is provided through the escalators, elevators, and straight staircases on the northern end of the main platforms. It is the only concourse with elevator access to and from the ground level and to and from the platform level.

The adjacent stairs and escalators that provides street level access to the concourse is often dubbed by commuters as "Mount Shaw Boulevard" due to the length of the staircase to the station's concourse, which is at level with the fourth and fifth floor of the Shangri-La Plaza mall.

EDSA Central concourse 
The southern EDSA Central concourse (also referred to as Building B) provides direct access to Greenfield Pavilion Mall (formerly EDSA Central), which in turn provides indirect access to the Greenfield District and the nearby jeepney terminal. Exiting through this concourse is provided through escalators and a bifurcated staircase from the southern end of the main platforms. Unlike the Shangri-La concourse which is a standalone building, the EDSA Central concourse is encapsulated within the Pavilion Mall and is located inside its structure.

Station platforms 
The station's main platforms consist of two island platforms with the outer sides serving the northbound and southbound tracks respectively, and the inner side serving the single reserve track. The platform space for the reserve track also doubles as additional platform space for commuters embarking and disembarking the trains during peak hours.

Elevated walkway 
A narrow, elevated walkway on the 2nd level of the station (outside of the fare gates) can be accessed at the midway of the Shaw Boulevard intersection escalators on the northern concourse. This provides access to the southern concourse and the establishments directly connected to it. Despite being at level with the platform, this walkway is not accessible without passing through the fare gates.

Nearby landmarks

The station serves the Ortigas Center and Greenfield business districts and is near three prominent shopping centers: Shangri-La Plaza, Pavilion Mall (formerly EDSA Central), and Starmall EDSA which are all connected by elevated pedestrian walkways. Commuters can also walk or take alternate forms of transportation to the EDSA Shangri-La Hotel, SM Megamall, St. Francis Square, and The Podium. Other nearby landmarks include the Cityland Grand Central Residences, Eurotel, AllBank main branch, San Miguel Corporation building, the Department of Education head office, University of Asia and the Pacific, Lourdes School of Mandaluyong, Astoria Plaza, PhilSports Arena, Capitol Commons, Wack Wack Village, and the Wack Wack Golf and Country Club. The news network CNN Philippines is one of the landmarks from the station.

Transportation links
Shaw Boulevard station is a major transfer point for commuters taking other forms of transportation such as buses, taxis, jeepneys, and UV Express. Three major jeepney and UV Express terminals are located either directly below or close to the station.

Prior to the establishment of the EDSA Busway, buses ran along EDSA below the station at their bus terminals at Starmall EDSA and SM Megamall. Currently, these stops are closed and there is no direct bus access to the station. Bus Route 16 (Pasig Palengke-Kalentong) has a EDSA-Shaw stop located at the intersection of Shaw Boulevard and San Miguel Avenue, while Starmall EDSA serves the Ortigas-Alabang and Ortigas-Taguig P2P bus routes.

Passengers may board taxis at various locations near the station. The closest taxi stands include Starmall, Greenfield District (at Santo Cristo Street), and Shangri-La Plaza (at the entrance opposite Shaw Boulevard).

See also
List of rail transit stations in Metro Manila
Manila Metro Rail Transit System Line 3

References

Manila Metro Rail Transit System stations
Railway stations opened in 1999
Buildings and structures in Mandaluyong
1999 establishments in the Philippines